Constantin Virgil Bănescu (born May 26, 1982 in Târgovişte, Romania – died August 12, 2009), was a notable Romanian poet of the 2000 generation, also known for his translation activity.

Poetry
 câinele, femeia şi ocheada (t: the dog, the woman and the glance) (Timpul, Iaşi, 2000);
 floarea cu o singură petală  (t: the flower with a single petal) (Junimea, Iaşi, 2002);
 acelaşi cer ce nu e (t: the same sky that is not)(Vinea, București, 2006);

(translations of his poetry available in German, Spanish, Slovenian and Hungarian).

Prizes
Prize of the Bucharest Young Writer's association
Hubert Burda Prize for Young Poets from the South and South-East Europe (2003)

References

External links
Some of his translations here

1982 births
2009 deaths
Romanian male poets
People from Târgoviște
20th-century Romanian poets
20th-century Romanian male writers